The following is a list of world cups and world championships for juniors and youth, sporting events which use one of these two names, or a name with a similar meaning. 
Tournaments which are formally defunct or where a further event is not currently planned are marked with a gray background.

Men

Women

Open

Mixed

See also
World championship
List of world sports championships
List of world championships in mind sports
World cup competition
List of multi-sport events
World School Championships
FISU World University Championships
Bridge: World Junior Teams Championship
Bridge: World Junior Pairs Championship
Chess: World Junior Chess Championship

Notes

    R.   – One or more relay events, in which three or four competitors compete for their nation, are included for each sex.
    D.   – Includes three Doubles events, one for men, one for women, and one for mixed doubles.

References